Dogwood Creek is a creek in the Maranoa Region, Queensland, Australia.

Geography

Fish found in the creek include golden perch, Mary River cod, Murray cod, silver perch, spangled perch and yabbies.

The creek eventually merges with the Balonne River to become part of the Condamine River.

History
The creek was named after the dogwood bushes in the area by explorer Ludwig Leichhardt on 23 October 1844 on his expedition from Moreton Bay to Port Essington (now Darwin, Northern Territory).

A commonly used track to access homesteads in the area (now the Warrego Highway) crossed the creek; that location became known as Dogwood Crossing. This would later develop into the town of Miles.

Dogwood Creek has flooded on many occasions, including 1908 and 1938.

References

External links
 Flooding of Dogwood Creek at Miles, 28 January 2013, (2:00 min video+audio)

Rivers of Queensland
Maranoa Region
Tributaries of the Darling River